The 2018–19 Memphis Tigers men's basketball team represented the University of Memphis in the 2018–19 NCAA Division I men's basketball season. This was the 98th season of Tiger basketball, the first under head coach Penny Hardaway, and the sixth as members of the American Athletic Conference. They played their home games at the FedEx Forum. They finished the season 22–14, 11–7 in AAC play to finish in fifth place. They defeated Tulane and UCF to advance to the semifinals of the AAC tournament where they lost to Houston. They were invited to the National Invitation Tournament where they defeated San Diego in the first round before losing in the second round to Creighton.

Previous season
The Tigers finished the 2017–18 season 21–13, 10–8 in AAC play to finish in a tie for fifth place. They defeated Tulsa in the AAC tournament before losing to Cincinnati in the semifinals. Despite having 21 wins, they did not participate in a postseason tournament for the second time.

On March 14, 2018, the school fired head coach Tubby Smith after two years. On March 20, the school hired former Memphis player and NBA star Penny Hardaway as coach.

Offseason

Departures

Incoming transfers

2018 recruiting class

2019 recruiting class

Roster

Schedule and results 

|-
!colspan=12 style=| Exhibition 
|-

|-
!colspan=12 style=| Non-conference regular season
|-

|-
!colspan=12 style=| AAC regular season

|-
!colspan=12 style=| AAC Tournament
|-

|-
!colspan=12 style=| NIT Tournament
|-

References

Memphis
Memphis Tigers men's basketball seasons
Memphis
Memphis